The Frog Prince, aka Cannon Movie Tales: The Frog Prince, Der Froschkönig (West Germany), is a 1986 musical film, based on the Brothers Grimm's classic fairytale. It was filmed in Tel Aviv, Israel. The tagline was "Cannon Movie Tales: Lavish, Feature length new versions of the world's best loved storybook classics."

The film was released on October 5, 1986, in the United Kingdom, with a BBFC Rating of U for Universal and June 1, 1988, in the United States, with an MPAA Rating of G for general audiences of all ages.

Plot

The Frog Prince begins with the protagonist Princess Zora rolling over and waking up in her bed. When she hears royal trumpets signifying an important announcement, she sings "Lucky Day" as she gets dressed. She holds onto her golden lucky ball, and carries it throughout her day for good luck. Zora runs through the castle and the Emissary and chef scold her for not acting 'like a princess'. Then, Zora is confronted by her eldest sister, Henrietta and Henrietta's friend Dulcey in the hallway, where Henrietta lies to Zora, telling her that they are allowed to interrupt the King that day. After Zora leaves, Henrietta tells Dulcey that she intercepted a letter which declared that only her or Zora is a true princess, not both.

Meanwhile, the King, surrounded by his advisors, reads the letter which declares that Baron Von Whobble will decide the true princess at the Sunset Dance. The King is upset because he made a promise to care for both of his nieces (Henrietta and Zora) when his sister died. He then sings "A Promise is A Promise" with his royal advisors. Princess Zora interrupts the meeting to ask about the trumpet announcement, but becomes too shy to ask when the King gets upset at her for interrupting.

After Zora leaves the King, she goes to ask Henrietta why she lied earlier. Henrietta ignores her question as she and Dulcey look through a book of eligible bachelors. They turn the page to see the handsome Prince of Freedly. The book says that a witch put a curse on him and that he has been missing for a year. When Zora asks to see, Henrietta banishes her from the room. That night at dinner, Henrietta arrives elegantly and is praised by the royal advisers. When Zora walks in dressed in a feathered cape, the advisors, Henrietta, and Dulcey laugh at her for looking silly. As Zora realizes she is being made fun of, she flees from the room. Her Uncle, the King, watches sadly, feeling pity for his niece.

Zora goes outside that night, wishing for someone to talk to at the edge of a fountain. After dropping her golden ball in the water, the water splashes from below, and a large, fully dressed frog named Ribbit emerges from the water. Zora asks "who are you?" in awe of the tall frog. To explain his abnormal physique, Ribbit sings "too tall frog" to Zora. Afterwards, Zora promises to be Ribbit's friend and take him home to the palace, in exchange for him retrieving her lucky ball from the fountain. The two sneak into Zora's chambers. Zora tells Ribbit that she does not think she is beautiful or a lady, and Ribbit says he thinks she is ravishing and that if she looks in the mirror long enough, she will see what he sees. Then, the King knocks on Zora's door and Ribbit has to hide. The King tells Zora there will be a Sunset Dance. After reading the letter, she finds out only one sister will be the princess. Ribbit then helps Zora become princess-like, teaching her how to dance and act ladylike. He then leaves because he needs to get back to the water, but promises to meet her by the fountain the next day. Zora gives him her lucky ball as a gift before he leaves. When Ribbit is back by the water, he admires the gift and sings about his newfound friend in "Friendship".

When Henrietta spies Ribbit teaching Zora how to be a princess, she gets angry, afraid that she will lose her spot as princess. She convinces Dulcey to help kidnap Ribbit and bring him away from the water. They put him in a hole in the ground where they trap him and leave him without water, but Dulcey marks a map of where he is hidden. The next morning, Zora is happy and dressed nicely. She goes to the fountain to meet Ribbit, but he's not there. Zora worries that he doesn't want to be her friend, and she sings "Have you forgotten me?" as she misses him. Henrietta tells Zora that she took Ribbit to the Woods of the Dark Heart, where he will die without water. Dulcey slips the map to Zora and tells her to hurry if she wants to save him. Zora runs into her uncle, and convinces him that she must help her friend. He tells her to come back before sunset so that the Baron Von Whobble can see her.

When searching the woods, Zora gets lost, and only finds Ribbit when her lucky golden ball shines bright from the trap. She pours water on Ribbit through the trap door to save him, and he slowly wakes up. Zora lifts him from the hole using a rope. The two hug, as Zora tells him that she's glad he's alright. She gives him a kiss on the cheek, which turns Ribbit back into the Prince of Freedly. He says there's no time to explain because they must return to the palace so Zora can be crowned the true princess. The lucky ball makes a horse appear, which the two ride back to the palace. While preparing for the coronation, Dulcey tells Henrietta that she is a cruel person and that she would rather be friends with Zora than with her.

Meanwhile, the King greets the Baron at the Sunset Dance and attempts to stall the crowd so that Zora can make it back in time for the ceremony. When the Prince of Freedly and Zora make it back to the castle, the Prince tries to bang on the gate in order to get inside. As they struggle outside, Henrietta the eldest enters the ballroom. All of the crowd gasps audibly at her beauty as she enters. Outside, the Prince wishes on the lucky ball that they can enter, and thus, the guard is awoken and opens the gate. Once they make it through, Zora's magic ball gives Zora a beautiful, clean dress. Before Henrietta can be crowned as princess, The Prince of Freedly bursts into the crowning ceremony and announces his identity, and saying that only a true princess could break the frog curse. Since Zora did that, she must be the true princess. The King lets a tear fall as he tells Zora how proud he is of her, and that she is beautiful because true beauty comes from inside.  Henrietta is outraged and leaves the ballroom.

Baron Von Whobble crowns Zora the true princess, and her Uncle the King escorts her to dance with the Prince of Freedly. The two dance together in front of the whole ballroom, and Zora asks "Are you really the Prince of Freedly?" In response, he says, "Yes, but do you know what my friends call me?" Finally, she says "Yes I do. Ribbit."

Cast
 Aileen Quinn - Princess Zora
 Helen Hunt - Princess Henrietta
 John Paragon - Ribbit / Prince Of Freedly
 Clive Revill - King William
 Seagull Cohen - Dulcey
 Eli Gorenstein - Cook
 Shmuel Atzmon - Baron Von Whobble
 Jeff Gerner - Emissary
 Aaron Kaplan - Page
 Moshe Ish-Kassit - Sleeping Guard

Box office
Goldcrest Films invested £896,000 in the film and received £334,000 in return, causing them to lose £562,000.

Critical reception 
AMG gave the film a 2.5-star rating. The Frog Prince received a negative review from the parental advice website Common Sense Media, in which member Renee Schonfeld describes the film as "harmless, but charmless" and ranks it a 2 out of 5 for Quality because of production, acting, storyline, and other complaints.

Soundtrack 

 "Theme Song"
Written by Kenn Long

 "Lucky Day"
Written by Kenn Long
Performed by Aileen Quinn

 "A Promise Is A Promise"
Written by Kenn Long
Performed by Clive Revill & Aileen Quinn

 "Too Tall Frog"
Written by Kenn Long
Performed by Nick Curtis

 "Music Box Waltz"
Written by Kenn Long

 "Friendship"
Written by Kenn Long
Performed by Aileen Quinn & Nick Curtis

 "Have You Forgotten Me?"
Written by Kenn Long 
Performed by Aileen Quinn

References

External links

1980s musical films
1986 films
English-language Israeli films
Films about princesses
Films based on Grimms' Fairy Tales
Films set in castles
Films shot in Israel
Golan-Globus films
Israeli musical films
Films based on fairy tales
Films produced by Menahem Golan
The Frog Prince
Cannon Movie Tales
Films produced by Yoram Globus
1980s English-language films